The Walterboro Historic District is a historic district in Walterboro, South Carolina. It was listed on the National Register of Historic Places in 1980 and expanded in 1993  to include the state-owned Walterboro High School at 807 Hampton Street, a building designed by James B. Urquhart and J. T. Dabbs in 1924.

The district also includes the Walterboro Library Society Building, which is separately listed on the NRHP. Other notable contributing properties include Fripp-Fishburne House.

References

External links

Historic districts on the National Register of Historic Places in South Carolina
Gothic Revival architecture in South Carolina
Buildings and structures in Colleton County, South Carolina
National Register of Historic Places in Colleton County, South Carolina